The Meon is a river in Hampshire, England.

Meon may also refer to:

Meon, Hampshire, a hamlet in the Fareham district of Hampshire, England
East Meon, village and civil parish in the East Hampshire district of Hampshire, England
West Meon, village and civil parish in Hampshire, England
Meon Valley (UK Parliament constituency), constituency represented in the House
Meon Valley Railway, (MVR) a cross-country railway in Hampshire, England that ran between Alton and Fareham
Meonstoke, Hampshire, England
Méon, a former commune in the Maine-et-Loire department in western France
Dioptis meon, a moth
Baal-meon, a biblical town
, a ship
Meonwara, a Jutish tribe that settled in the Meon Valley during the 5th and 6th Centuries